Mohammed Khalfan (Arabic: محمد خلفان) (born 18 May 1994) is a Qatari footballer.

External links

References

Qatari footballers
1994 births
Living people
Qatar Stars League players
Al-Arabi SC (Qatar) players
Association football forwards